Wrestlepalooza was a professional wrestling event produced by Extreme Championship Wrestling (ECW). It took place in 1995, 1997, 1998 and 2000. The 1998 iteration aired on pay-per-view. The footage from the four Wrestlepalooza events is owned by WWE.

Dates, venues and main events

External links
 

 
Recurring events established in 1995
Recurring events disestablished in 2000